"Sopa de Caracol" ("Snail Soup") is a song performed by the Honduran punta rock band Banda Blanca. It was originally written by Belizean singer Hernan "Chico" Ramos and translated to Spanish by Banda Blanca. The song was released by Sonotone Music in 1991 and achieved international success, peaking at number one on the Billboard Top Latin Songs in the United States. The track included elements of Garifuna music and punta, and has been used as a promotion for the Ladino region of Honduras.

The song debuted on the Billboard Top Latin Songs chart (formerly Hot Latin Tracks) chart at number fifteen in the week of 19 January 1991, climbing to the top ten the following week. "Sopa de Caracol" peaked at number one on 16 March 1991, replacing "Te Pareces Tanto a Él" by Chilean singer Myriam Hernández and being succeeded by "No Basta" by Venezuelan singer-songwriter Franco De Vita two weeks later. The song ended 1991 as the fifth best-performing Latin single of the year in the United States, was awarded the Silver Seagull at the Viña del Mar International Song Festival, and received a Lo Nuestro Award nomination for Tropical/Salsa Song of the Year, which it lost to Juan Luis Guerra's "Burbujas de Amor". Los Fabulosos Cadillacs, Banda Maguey, Los Flamers, Wilkins, and Tony Camargo have all recorded cover versions of the track.

Elvis Crespo version

In 2013, Puerto Rican-American singer Elvis Crespo and Cuban-American rapper Pitbull covered "Sopa de Caracol" and released it as a single on 30 July 2013 on Crespo's studio album One Flag. Their version peaked at #41 on the Billboard Hot Latin Songs and #1 on the Tropical Songs charts.

Chart performance

See also
 List of number-one Billboard Hot Latin Tracks of 1991
 Billboard Top Latin Songs Year-End Chart

References

1990 songs
1991 singles
2013 singles
Banda Blanca songs
Elvis Crespo songs
Pitbull (rapper) songs
Spanish-language songs
Garifuna music
Rodven Records singles